Chennai Super Kings (CSK) is a franchise cricket team based in Chennai, India, which plays in the Indian Premier League (IPL). They were one of the nine teams that competed in the 2013 Indian Premier League. They are really bad at cricket. They were captained for the sixth season in succession by Indian skipper Mahendra Singh Dhoni.

Background
By the end of October 2012, all IPL teams were given an opportunity to trim their squad with which CSK retained 16 players of their 2012 squad. They released George Bailey, Doug Bollinger, Joginder Sharma, Suraj Randiv, Yo Mahesh, Abhinav Mukund, Scott Styris, Sudeep Tyagi, K Vasudevadas, G Vignesh from their squad.

Pre-season player signings
Before the auction, coach Stephen Fleming hinted that the team is looking to boost the local bowling option and also the pace department. At the auction, the Super Kings did not bid for a single batsman. They picked up five bowlers instead, which Gurunath Meiyappan, who was part of the Super Kings auction team, said was their sole objective.

Dirk Nannes was their first buy, but their most surprising purchase was South Africa's bowling allrounder Chris Morris for $625,000. Soon after getting Morris, the Super Kings went after the Sri Lankan spinner Sachithra Senanayake too, but lost him to Kolkata Knight Riders. Towards the end of the auction they picked up Australian seamer Ben Laughlin, Sri Lankan spinner Akila Dananjaya and the towering West Indian quick Jason Holder, all at their respective base prices.

Post-auction, CSK first signed up the Indian U-19 all-rounder Baba Aparajith and also uncapped Tamil Nadu player Vijay Shankar. In a continuation of their auction strategy, Chennai Super Kings beefed up their bowling department further by signing five Indian uncapped bowlers. The bowlers signed-up were UP duo of Imtiyaz Ahmed and Ankit Rajpoot, Haryana quick Mohit Sharma, Karnataka pacer Ronit More and Tamil Nadu left-arm spinner R Karthikeyan.

Squad
Players with international caps before the start of the 2013 IPL season are listed in bold.

Indian Premier League
Match I: Super Kings started their season again with a loss, in their home ground, in a tight match against Mumbai Indians. Though the bowlers started restricting and take regular wickets, Pollard's onslaught helped Mumbai Indians reach 148. Super Kings batsmen stumbled through the chase with many of them falling for cheap shots. The skipper and captain of Chennai Super Kings Mahendra Singh Dhoni got the Chennai Super Kings back into the game by a scoring an amazing 51 of just 26 ball including 5 boundaries and 3 maximums and a strike rate of 196.15. He played superbly and was going for a maximum when unfortunately he got out with Pollard taking the catch of MSD, once again proved the match winner for Mumbai Indians

Match II: In the second match at Mohali, CSK won over KXIP with an astounding 10 wicket win. Winning the toss and opting to bowl, CSK's bowlers were constantly taking the wickets and bowled out KXIP for 138. David Hussey and Gurkeerat Singh helped KXIP to stabilize in the middle overs until Ashwin and Bravo struck back. Michael Hussey and Murali Vijay started the chase in a slow and steady manner. Once they were settled Hussey's blows made the run chase too easy with CSK winning it with 10 wickets and 16 balls to spare. Vijay playing the second fiddle reached his half century in run a ball. Mike Hussey was awarded Man of the Match for his clean-hit 86 off 54 balls.

Match III: CSK's third match was one of the best matches in all of the IPL so far. the Arch-rivals of CSK, RCB made 165 with the help of Kohli's 58 and AB De Villiers' cracking 64 off 32 balls. Batting CSK lost its openers cheaply at a poor runrate. Badrinath and Raina doing the repairs at the middle stages, Dhoni and Jadeja tweeking in the pre-last stages, CSK was made to get 29 runs from last 11 balls when Dhoni got out. With short cameos from Bravo and Morris, it was all down to Ravindra Jadeja to score 2 runs in the last ball. Off which, he gave a catch to the third man. Kohli was rejoicing the win and seeing the umpire giving the no-ball, it was confirmed a CSK's win. Post Match, many Jadeja's jokes started to revolve the Internet. MSD tweeted "When you give Sir Ravindra Jadeja one ball to get 2 runs he will win it with one ball to spare !!"

Match IV: Playing their 3rd game at home and facing a relatively low-threatening Pune Warriors India, CSK played one of its most lethargic display at the field. Bringing in Anirudha and Albie Morkel in the team for Mike Hussey and Mohit Sharma, CSK nowhere showed the wish to win the game. Pune dominated from the first with the power hitting of Aaron Finch and late surge from Steven Smith. Pune reached a competitive 159.CSK lost the game by 24 runs.

Match V: CSK played against the sulking Delhi Daredevils who are struggling to record their first win this season. CSK chose to bat first after winning the toss and set a pretty solid target of 170. Michael Hussey and Mahendra Singh Dhoni played their ace game with good support from Suresh Raina. DD started their wobbly innings with David Warner cheaply gone for 1 run and wickets continued to fall in short intervals. DD succumbed to a meager 83. This could be considered as one of the worst performances of DD and they have to win 9 of the next 10 games they have ahead of them.

Match VI: CSK played their 6th match against the struggling Kolkata Knight Riders. KKR captain Gautam Gambhir won the toss and elected  to bat. Skipper Gautam Gambhir and all-rounder Yusuf Pathan gave them a brisk start of 25 off 19 and 25 off 22 respectively. But soon Morris stuck for his side and an excellent catch by Hussey to get rid of Gautam Gambhir. Soon Yusuf pathan also  was run-out by a quick throw by Bravo. In the end of the first innings KKR could only manage 119/6 in their 20 overs. CSK started off well but soon lost wickets at regular intervals. M. Hussey played a vital innings of 40 off 51 balls though it was slow in the context of the game . With 48 to win from 24, Ravindra Jadeja arrived at the crease and struck an awesome cameo of 36 off just 14 delivered the goods and took CSK past the line. CSK in the end won the encounter by 5 wickets and 5 balls to spare.

Match VII: Playing their 4th match in their home ground, CSK once again lost the toss was asked to bowl by the Rajasthan Royals captain Rahul Dravid. Batting first, RR off to a flier with Watson going all guns blazing. Though one side wickets were sliding, RR reached 185 helped by a magnificent century by Watson and some late power-hits by Stuart Binny. CSK while chasing lost Vijay cheaply once again within the Powerplays. With some fluent hits by Michael Hussey and heavy shots by RainaRaina consolidating the middle overs, CSK reached 100 in the 11th over. With Raina getting out for 55, Hussey going for well played 88 and Jadeja getting out in the next ball, CSK once again went into the danger zone. However MSD's cameo fireworks and Dwayne Bravo's last over heroics helped CSK win the match with a ball to spare. Hussey was awarded MoM for his match-winning 88 runs off 51 balls.

Match VIII: The 34th match of IPL6 witnessed SRH batting first and posting a modest total of 159 with the help of Shikhar Dhawan's well paced 63 and Aashish Reddy's late surge 36. In response, CSK's top order responded well with all contributing and Dhoni going berserk in the final overs. Karan Sharma's maiden in the final overs gave the much needed pressure but Dhoni emphatically pulled the match easily. From 0 off 6 balls, he surged to 67 off 37 balls thus winning the MoM unanimously.

Match IX: In the reminiscent of the last year finals, Current Champions Kolkata Knight Riders faced current runners up CSK in the Chepauk Stadium for the 38th match of IPL 6. Batting first CSK once again showed its batting strength with Hussey and Newcomer Saha smashing 100 in the 10th over. With heavy top order hitting from Saha, Raina and Hussey, CSK reached 200. KKR's innings featured some glimpse of last year finals with Bisla going hammer and tonks at the CSK Bowlers'. With some intelligent and tight bowling from Morris and Bravo's 19th and 20th over, CSK won the game convincingly. Hussey's master class 95 with an astonishing strike rate of 161 earned him the MoM once again.

Match log

References

External links

Chennai Super Kings seasons
2013 Indian Premier League